HNK Segesta is a Croatian football club located in the city of Sisak. It is named after the Illyrian settlement Segesta from which the modern town of Sisak developed. Segesta is one of the oldest Croatian football clubs, although there are no written records of its precise founding date. The first mention in a news outlet is from the year 1909, which makes the club older than many a famous side in the country, and definitely one among the oldest mentioned clubs in the country's history.

History 
The first written trace of "Segesta" can be found in the weekly "Novi Sisački Glas" from the 8th of August 1909, when a club named Segesta played a match against Concordia Zagreb. The most important information about the club and  people who organized it can be found only on the occasion of the celebration of its 20th anniversary. That anniversary was marked from the 26th to the 29th of June 1927, when the first club playground was also inaugurated. The event was covered by the local weekly magazine "Hrvatske novine" and some of the original founders were interviewed and claimed the club was created in June or early July 1906 by a group of school students: The story goes that 12 year old Ivo Stipčić and about twenty of his friends gathered at Ivo's uncle Ivan Šešek (today's Ivana Kukuljevića-Sakcinskog Street, number 4) inn, and decided to found a sport club. The founders agreed that the first president of the club would be the owner of the ball, that is Ivo Stipčić, and "Segesta" was chosen as the name of the club after the name of the old Celtic-Illyrian settlement in the area of Sisak - Segestica. Since the members of the club were mostly pupils and students who stayed in Sisak  during the summer school holidays, it was named "Holiday Sports Club Segesta".

The weekly magazine "Sisak" in a 1912 edition featured a list of Sisak-based football clubs, and Segesta is said to exist only through holidays, and the following year the weekly Posavac says of Segesta that it was "the first club in Sisak" and that it "kept somewhat afloat and functioned". The Zagreb-based newspaper Šport from 1919 mentions Segesta as "the first Sisak-based club, Holiday sports club Segesta". Thus the precise and real founding date is not sure, due to a lack of any documentation about the happening.

With the establishment of the communist regime in Jugoslavia, Segesta, as all other sport clubs in the country gets dissolved by the communist authorities, only for Sport Club Naprijed to be established in its place. The club will play as Naprijed between 1946 and 1952, when it is renamed Segesta again and since then it plays in the lower leagues of the Yugoslav competitions. In the 1977/78 season, Segesta achieved great success by winning the title of Croatian champion-region north. With this success, she achieved the right to play in the finals of the Croatian Championship with the champion of the Croatian Football League - Region South, NK Solin. That match was automatically a qualification to enter the 2nd Federal Football League. The first match was played in Sisak on June 18, 1978. There were about eight thousand spectators at the "Bratstvo-jedinstvo" stadium, and Segesta won 2-0 with goals from Josip Cavrić. In the return match in Solin, the hosts won 1-0, which was enough for Segesti to celebrate the club's greatest success since World War II. In 1978, Segesta achieved another notable result, when the club won the title of Croatian amateur champion.

In independent Croatia, Segesta played in the first state league several times. In the 1992/93 season it finished in 10th place; 1993/94 in 9th place; 1994/95 in 8th place; 1995/96 in 6th place in the first A league; in 1996/97 im 11th place, after which it no longer managed to stay in the first league.

The club played in the Croatian Football Cup in the 1992/93 and 1993/94 seasons (quarterfinals), 1994/95 (round of 16), 1996/97 (round of 16), 1998/99 (quarterfinals), 2000/01 (round of 16), as well as in 2001/02, 2002/03, 2003/04.

Honours
Treća HNL – Center:
Winners (2): 2002–03, 2012–13

Recent seasons

 – COVID-19 season

Key

Top scorer shown in bold when he was also top scorer for the division.

P = Played
W = Games won
D = Games drawn
L = Games lost
F = Goals for
A = Goals against
Pts = Points
Pos = Final position

1. HNL = Prva HNL
2. HNL = Druga HNL
3. HNL = Treća HNL
4. HNL = Četvrta HNL

GS = Group Stage
PR = Preliminary round
R1 = Round 1
R2 = Round 2
QF = Quarter-finals
SF = Semi-finals
RU = Runners-up
W  = Winners

European record
Segesta qualified for the 1996 UEFA Intertoto Cup, reaching the final stage before losing over two legs to Silkeborg IF on the away goals rule.

Summary

Pld = Matches played; W = Matches won; D = Matches drawn; L = Matches lost; GF = Goals for; GA = Goals against. Defunct competitions indicated in italics.

By season

Manager history
  Srećko Bogdan
  Milivoj Bračun
  Branko Ivanković
  Mirko Kokotović
  Zlatko Kranjčar
  Mladen Munjaković
  Vjeran Simunić
  Ratko Ninković
  Ivan Pudar

References

External links
Official website 

 
Sisak
Football clubs in Croatia
Football clubs in Sisak-Moslavina County
Football clubs in Yugoslavia
Association football clubs established in 1906
1906 establishments in Croatia